Aurora Galli (born 13 December 1996) is an Italian professional footballer who plays as a midfielder for Everton and the Italian national team.

Career
She played for Italy at UEFA Women's Euro 2017. On 28 July 2021, Galli signed for Everton, in doing so she became the first Italian player to sign for a Women's Super League club, as well as the first ever Italian female footballer to play professional football following the transition to professionalism of the FA Women's Super League in 2018.

On 2 March 2022, Galli scored her first Women's Super League goal for Everton against Aston Villa.

International goals

Honours
Torres
 Italian Women's Super Cup: 2013

Juventus
 Serie A: 2017–18, 2018–19, 2019–20, 2020–21
 Coppa Italia: 2018–19
 Supercoppa Italiana: 2019, 2020–21

Individual
 AIC Best Women's XI: 2019
 Everton Spirit of the blues award: 2022

Private life 
Galli lives together with Swedish footballer Nathalie Björn in a same-sex relationship.

References

External links

 
 

1996 births
Living people
Italian women's footballers
Italy women's international footballers
Sportspeople from the Province of Pavia
Torres Calcio Femminile players
A.S.D. AGSM Verona F.C. players
Juventus F.C. (women) players
Serie A (women's football) players
Women's association football midfielders
Atalanta Mozzanica Calcio Femminile Dilettantistico players
2019 FIFA Women's World Cup players
ASD Femminile Inter Milano players
Everton F.C. (women) players
Expatriate women's footballers in England
Italian expatriate sportspeople in England
Footballers from Lombardy
UEFA Women's Euro 2022 players
Italian LGBT sportspeople
LGBT association football players
Lesbian sportswomen
21st-century LGBT people
UEFA Women's Euro 2017 players
Italian expatriate women's footballers